James McLean may refer to:

Sports
 James McLean (golfer) (born 1978), Australian professional golfer
 Jim McLean (golfer) (born 1950), American golfer and instructor
 Jim McLean (born 1937), Scottish football player and manager (Dundee United)
 Jim McLean (Australian footballer)  (1880–1917), Australian rules footballer (Melbourne FC)
 Jimmy McLean (1934–1995), Scottish footballer
 Jimmy McLean (footballer, born 1876) (1876–1914), English footballer
 Jimmy McLean (footballer, born 1881) (1881–?), Scottish footballer

Politicians
 James Henry McLean (1829–1886), American politician and U.S. Representative for Missouri 
 James R. McLean (1842–1903), merchant and politician in Prince Edward Island, Canada
 James Robert McLean (1823–1870), Confederate politician
 James McLean (Arkansas politician), American politician and state legislator in Arkansas
 James McLean (Maryland politician) (died 1956), American politician in Maryland

Others
 James McLean (mobster) (1929–1965), Boston mobster and leader of the Winter Hill Gang
 James Hamilton McLean (born 1936), American malacologist
 James E. McLean, dean of the University of Alabama College of Education
 James Monroe McLean (1818–1890), American insurance executive and banker

See also
 James MacLean (disambiguation)
 James McClean (born 1989), Irish footballer